Interstate 15W or I-15W were former designations for one of the following:
Interstate 15 (California) (temporary route while I-15 was under construction)
Interstate 86 (former designation)

W
15W